Geranylgeranyl-diphosphate:protein-cysteine geranyltransferase may refer to:
 Protein geranylgeranyltransferase type I
 Protein geranylgeranyltransferase type II